The Stripper is a 1963 American drama film about a struggling, aging actress-turned-stripper, played by Joanne Woodward, and the people she knows.  It is based on the play A Loss of Roses by William Inge.

This was the feature film debut of director Franklin J. Schaffner, and co-starred Carol Lynley, Robert Webber, and Richard Beymer. Also appearing as Madame Olga was real-life stripper Gypsy Rose Lee.  It was the first Schaffner film to feature a score by prolific composer Jerry Goldsmith, who would later work with Schaffner on such films as Planet of the Apes, Patton, Papillon, and The Boys from Brazil.

William Travilla was nominated for the Academy Award for Best Costume Design, Black-and-White.

The film was intended to be a vehicle for two Fox contract stars, Marilyn Monroe and Pat Boone, but Monroe died in 1962 and Boone refused the role on moral grounds.

Plot
Lila Green dreamed of a career in the movies, but has found little success. She joins a group of traveling entertainers and is abandoned near her Kansas hometown by manager and boyfriend Ricky Powers.

Old friend Helen Baird takes her into her home, where Helen's young son Kenny becomes infatuated with Lila. Somewhat delusional, she at first sees a future for their relationship, until coming to her senses.

Ricky returns and offers Lila a job doing a striptease. In need of money, she accepts. Kenny witnesses her show and finally realizes she is not the dream girl he loved.

Cast

Joanne Woodward as Lila Green
Richard Beymer as Kenny Baird
Claire Trevor as Helen Baird
Carol Lynley as Miriam Caswell
Robert Webber as Ricky Powers
Louis Nye as Ronnie Cavendish
Gypsy Rose Lee as Madame Olga
Michael J. Pollard as Jelly
Sondra Kerr as Edwina
Susan Brown as Mrs. Mulvaney
Marlene De Lamater as Sandra Mulvaney
Ralph Lee as Sonny
Gary Pagett as Dizzy
Bing Russell as Mr. Mulvaney

References

External links

1963 films
1963 drama films
20th Century Fox films
American black-and-white films
American drama films
American films based on plays
Films about entertainers
Films directed by Franklin J. Schaffner
Films scored by Jerry Goldsmith
Films set in Kansas
Films about striptease
1963 directorial debut films
CinemaScope films
1960s English-language films
1960s American films